Hiscox is a surname. Notable people with the surname include:

Gertrude Hiscox (1910-1966), British collaborator
Heather Hiscox (born 1965), Canadian news anchor
Jack Hiscox (born 1995), Australian rules footballer
Ralph Hiscox (1907–1970), British businessman
Robert Hiscox (born 1943), British businessman